Mikulášová is a village and municipality in Bardejov District in the Prešov Region of north-east Slovakia.

History
The village was first mentioned in historical records in 1414.

Geography
It has a population of about 145 people.

References

External links
 
 
https://web.archive.org/web/20071116010355/http://www.statistics.sk/mosmis/eng/run.html

Villages and municipalities in Bardejov District
Šariš